The Santa Monica Mirror is a weekly community newspaper which covers Santa Monica, California. It circulates around 10,000 copies weekly according to their website.  The Mirror focuses on local happenings, events, sports, and arts.  The Mirror also has a daily updated site with all current and breaking news in Santa Monica and the local area.  The paper's stories are written by local residents.

History
The publication was founded by Michael Rosenthal, Judy Swartz, Peggy Clifford, and Deborah Daly in 1999. When Rosenthal died in 2009, The Mirror was acquired by then Editor-In-Chief Thomas Montemer.

In January 2012, Montemer launched The Santa Monica Beat, a video show averaging five minutes that has new episodes appear every Monday at 9 a.m. at www.smmirror.com. The show alternates between covering current events, entertainment, local business, and youth. Each episode also includes a weekend sports wrap-up during the school year.

In May 2012, Montemer launched The Mirror's second show called The Seven Days Show, which is about three minutes in length, also on www.smmirror.com. This show covers lifestyle-themed stories in Santa Monica and the surrounding region, including art gallery exhibitions, fashion news, happy hours, live music, and restaurant reviews. New episodes of The Seven Days Show appear every Thursday at 1 p.m.

In August 2013, Mirror Media Group, publisher of the Santa Monica Mirror and parent company of Direct Community Video, acquired the biweekly business publication The Century City News and monthly community publication Brentwood News. Montemer appointed Santa Monica Mirror Editor-In-Chief Brenton Garen to Mirror Media Group Executive Editor to oversee all editorial content for all three publications.

In July, 2018, Sam Catanzaro was appointed to be the Editor-In-Chief of the Santa Monica Mirror, replacing Jennifer Eden.

References

External links

Newspapers published in Greater Los Angeles
Santa Monica, California
Mass media in Los Angeles County, California
Publications established in 1999
Weekly newspapers published in California